is a passenger railway station located in the city of Kishiwada, Osaka Prefecture, Japan, operated by the private railway operator Nankai Electric Railway. It has the station number "NK24".

Lines

Layout
The station consists of two elevated island platforms with the station building underneath.

Platforms

Adjacent stations

History
Kishiwada Station opened on 1 October 1897.

Passenger statistics
In fiscal 2019, the station was used by an average of 12,577 passengers daily.

Surrounding area
 Kishiwada City Hall
Osaka Prefectural Kishiwada High School
Osaka Prefectural Izumi High School
Kishiwada City Industrial High Schoo

See also
 List of railway stations in Japan

References

External links

  

Railway stations in Japan opened in 1897
Railway stations in Osaka Prefecture
Kishiwada, Osaka